El Punt (meaning in English "The Point") was a Catalan daily newspaper based in Girona, Catalonia (Spain). The newspaper was renamed in 1990 from the original Punt Diari ('Daily Point'). It was published between 24 February 1979 and 31 July 2011.

History and profile
The newspaper was founded on 24 February 1979. In the beginning the paper was only circulated in the province of Girona, but from 11 September 2004 it became available in the province of Barcelona.  By 2008 it had seven editions: Barcelona, Girona, Barcelonès nord, Maresme, Camp de Tarragona-Terres de l'Ebre, Penedès, and Vallès Occidental. 

On 31 July 2011, the newspaper merged with the newspaper Avui, creating the new newspaper El Punt Avui. El Punt, however, kept an own edition for the Girona area, where the original El Punt newspaper was born.

The Catalan government subsidises with important amounts those Catalan newspapers with at least one Catalan language edition. In 2008, El Punt was the most subsidised of them all in terms of circulation/funds granted, having received almost 2 million euros, which amounts to 72 euros a year per newspaper sold per day, or almost 20 Euro cent per newspaper actually sold.

References

External links 
El Punt Avui  — official website

1979 establishments in Spain
2011 disestablishments in Spain
Newspapers established in 1979
Publications disestablished in 2011
Defunct newspapers published in Spain
Newspapers published in Catalonia
Catalan-language newspapers
Mass media in Girona
Daily newspapers published in Spain